Henry Perrin Beatty  (born June 1, 1950) is a Canadian corporate executive and former politician, who served as a Progressive Conservative of the House of Commons from 1972 to 1993, and as a cabinet minister from 1979 to 1980 and again from 1984 to 1993.

Life and career
Beatty is a graduate of Upper Canada College in Toronto, Ontario, and of the University of Western Ontario in London.

He first won election to the House of Commons of Canada as a Progressive Conservative at the age of 22 in the 1972 election.

In 1979 he became, at the time, the youngest person ever appointed to a Canadian Cabinet when Prime Minister Joe Clark made Beatty his minister of state for the Treasury Board in his short-lived government. Beatty returned to the opposition benches as a result of the defeat of the Clark government in the 1980 election.

With the Conservative victory in the 1984 election, Prime Minister Brian Mulroney made Beatty Minister of National Revenue and Minister responsible for Canada Post. He subsequently served as Solicitor General of Canada (1985–1986), Minister of National Defence (1986–1989), Minister of National Health and Welfare (1989–1991), and Minister of Communications (1991–1993).

Despite long being touted as a future Tory leader, Beatty did not run in the 1993 Progressive Conservative leadership election to succeed Mulroney. He was promoted to Secretary of State for External Affairs in the short-lived government of Mulroney's successor, Kim Campbell, but lost his seat in the 1993 election which returned only two Tory MPs.

In 1995 the Liberal government of Prime Minister Jean Chrétien appointed Beatty President and Chief Executive Officer of the Canadian Broadcasting Corporation, a position he held until 1999 when he became president and CEO of Canadian Manufacturers & Exporters, a business association that promotes the interests of Canadian industry and exporters.

In August 2007 Beatty left the CME to become president and CEO of the Canadian Chamber of Commerce.
Beatty served as Chancellor of the University of Ontario Institute of Technology (UOIT) in Oshawa, Ontario from 2008 to 2015. He has received honorary degrees from UOIT and Western University.

In 2012 Beatty received an honorary Certified International Trade Professional (CITP) designation from the Forum for International Trade Training.

In May 2020, Beatty was appointed to serve on Canada's COVID-19 Supply Council.

Honors
 Order of the Rising Sun, 2nd Class, Gold and Silver Star (2020)

Order of Canada (2018)

Publications
Book chapter: Hong Kong: Canada's Partner in Prosperity, 2011

References

External links

Henry Perrin Beatty, at The Canadian Encyclopedia

1950 births
Living people
Businesspeople from Toronto
Politicians from Toronto
Members of the 21st Canadian Ministry
Members of the 24th Canadian Ministry
Members of the 25th Canadian Ministry
Members of the House of Commons of Canada from Ontario
Members of the United Church of Canada
Progressive Conservative Party of Canada MPs
University of Western Ontario alumni
Members of the King's Privy Council for Canada
Officers of the Order of Canada
Presidents of the Canadian Broadcasting Corporation
Upper Canada College alumni
Canadian Secretaries of State for External Affairs
Canadian Ministers of Health and Welfare
Solicitors General of Canada
Recipients of the Order of the Rising Sun, 2nd class